Isabelle Andersson (born 12 March 2000) is a Swedish handball player for H 65 Höör and the Swedish national team.

She was going to have her senior championship debut in the 2020 summer olympics, however four days before the tournament started she injured her knee and had to leave.

Individual awards 
 All-Star Team as Best defender in 2017 European U-17 Handball Championship
 All-Star Team as Best left back in 2018 Youth World Handball Championship
 "Årets Komet" 2021

References

2000 births
Living people
Handball players from Stockholm
Swedish female handball players
21st-century Swedish women